Geoffroy is a surname. Notable persons with that surname include:

 Jean-Baptiste Geoffroy (1601–1675), French composer
 Jean-Nicolas Geoffroy (1633–1694), French harpsichordist and organist
 Étienne François Geoffroy (1672–1731), French apothecary and chemist
 Claude Joseph Geoffroy (1685–1752), French apothecary, chemist and botanist; younger brother of Étienne François Geoffroy
 Étienne Louis Geoffroy (1725–1810), French entomologist
 Claude François Geoffroy (1729–1753), French chemist, discoverer of bismuth
 Julien Louis Geoffroy (1743–1814), French literary critic
 Jean-Baptiste Lislet Geoffroy (1755–1836), French astronomer, botanist and cartographer
 Étienne Geoffroy Saint-Hilaire (1772–1844), French naturalist
 Isidore Geoffroy Saint-Hilaire (1805–1861), French zoologist, son of Étienne Geoffroy Saint-Hilaire
 Henri-Jules-Jean Geoffroy (1853-1924), French painter

See also 
Geoffrey (given name)
Jeffries
Jeffers

Surnames of French origin
Germanic-language surnames